GoldenEye is a 1995 spy film, the seventeenth in the James Bond series produced by Eon Productions, and the first to star Pierce Brosnan as the fictional MI6 agent James Bond. Directed by Martin Campbell, it was the first in the series not to utilize any story elements from the works of novelist Ian Fleming. It was also the first James Bond film not produced by Albert R. Broccoli, following his stepping down from Eon Productions and replacement by his daughter, Barbara Broccoli (along with Michael G. Wilson, although Albert was still involved as a consultant producer; it was his final film project before his death in 1996). The story was conceived and written by Michael France, with later collaboration by other writers. In the film, Bond fights to prevent a rogue ex-MI6 agent (Sean Bean) from using a satellite weapon against London to cause a global financial meltdown.

The film was released after a six-year hiatus in the series caused by legal disputes, during which Timothy Dalton’s contract for the role of James Bond expired and he was replaced by Brosnan. M was also recast, with actress Judi Dench becoming the first woman to portray the character, replacing Robert Brown. The role of Miss Moneypenny was also recast, with Caroline Bliss being replaced by Samantha Bond; Desmond Llewelyn was the only actor to reprise his role, as Q. It was the first Bond film made after the dissolution of the Soviet Union and the end of the Cold War, which provided a background for the plot. Principal photography for GoldenEye took place in the UK, Russia, Monte Carlo and Puerto Rico; it was the inaugural film production to be shot at Leavesden Studios. The first Bond film to use computer-generated imagery (CGI), GoldenEye was also the final film of special effects supervisor Derek Meddings's career, and was dedicated to his memory.

The film accumulated a worldwide gross of over US$350 million, considerably better than Dalton's films, without taking inflation into account. It received positive reviews, with critics viewing Brosnan as a definite improvement over his predecessor. It also received award nominations for Best Special Visual Effects and Best Sound from the British Academy of Film and Television Arts.

Plot

In 1986, MI6 agents James Bond and Alec Trevelyan infiltrate a Soviet chemical weapons facility in Arkhangelsk. While Trevelyan is caught and assumed killed by Colonel Arkady Grigorovich Ourumov, the facility's commanding officer, Bond destroys the site and escapes.

While undergoing an assessment nine years later, after the dissolution of the Soviet Union, Bond attempts to prevent Xenia Onatopp, a member of the Janus crime syndicate, from stealing a Eurocopter Tiger attack helicopter during a military demonstration in Monte Carlo, but is unable to prevent the theft. Returning to MI6 Headquarters in London, Bond oversees MI6 staff monitoring an incident in Severnaya, Siberia, after the stolen helicopter turns up at a radar facility there. An electromagnetic pulse blast suddenly hits the site, destroying it and Russian fighter aircraft, while knocking out all satellite systems in orbit above.

The newly appointed M assigns Bond to investigate, after it is determined the blast came from a Soviet-era satellite armed with a nuclear electromagnetic pulse space-based weapon, codenamed "GoldenEye". Although Janus is suspected of initiating the attack, Bond suspects Ourumov, now a general, was involved because the weapon system required high-level military access. Travelling to Saint Petersburg, Bond is advised by his CIA contact Jack Wade to meet the former KGB agent turned gangster Valentin Zukovsky and have him arrange a meeting with Janus. Escorted to the meeting by Onatopp, Bond discovers that Janus is led by Trevelyan, who had faked his death at Arkhangelsk, and learns Trevelyan is descended from the Lienz Cossacks who were repatriated to the Soviet Union after collaborating with the Axis powers during World War II. Since Bond set the bomb timers in Arkhangelsk to 3 minutes instead of 6 as they both originally planned, the resulting explosion left Trevelyan with severe scarring on one side of his face, which is how he came up with the name ‘Janus,’ after the “two-faced Roman god.”

Realizing that Trevelyan seeks revenge against Britain for betraying his parents, Bond is sedated and trapped in the stolen Tiger alongside Natalya Simonova, a survivor of the Severnaya attack. After escaping the helicopter's destruction, the pair are taken into custody and interrogated by Russian Minister of Defence Dimitri Mishkin. The heated argument between the men leads Natalya to affirm Ourumov's involvement in the use of GoldenEye, and that fellow programmer Boris Grishenko survived along with her and is now working for Janus in operating a second GoldenEye satellite. Before Mishkin can act on the information, Ourumov kills him and captures Natalya. Commandeering a tank, Bond eventually pursues Ourumov to a missile train used by Janus. On board, he finds Trevelyan and Onatopp, along with Natalya who is being held hostage at gunpoint by Ourumov, at Trevelyan's request. Bond kills Ourumov and saves Natalya while Trevelyan and Onatopp escape in a helicopter. Trevelyan rigs the train to explode, but Bond and Natalya manage to escape with only seconds to spare. 

Bond and Natalya travel to Cuba, after Boris is traced to a location within the island's jungles via the computer system on the train. While flying over the area, the pair are shot down. Onatopp attacks them after they crash land, but Bond kills her during the fight. The pair soon uncover a hidden base beneath a large lake, concealing a satellite dish, and proceed to infiltrate it. Bond is captured while trying to rig the base to explode, and learns from Trevelyan that he intends to use GoldenEye to devastate London to conceal the theft of financial records from the Bank of England. While Natalya is captured as well, she hacks into the satellite and reprograms it to initiate atmospheric re-entry and thus destroy itself. When Boris loses his patience trying to undo her programming, Bond uses the moment to trigger a grenade, concealed in a pen, to allow him and Natalya to escape.

To prevent Boris from regaining control of the satellite, Bond sabotages the dish's antenna by jamming its gears. Trevelyan tries to intercept him, and the ensuing fight between the two culminates in Trevelyan being dangled below the antenna. When Trevelyan asks Bond if he is killing him for England, Bond admits it is for himself before dropping Trevelyan to the roof on the control center. Trevelyan survives the fall, but is very badly wounded. Natalya soon rescues Bond in a commandeered helicopter, moments before the antenna malfunctions and explodes, destroying the base and killing its personnel, with Trevelyan killed by the falling debris and Boris (presumably) killed by ruptured liquid nitrogen canisters which freeze him solid (ironically only seconds after he declared his own invincibility due to surviving the first blast). After landing in a meadow, the pair prepare to enjoy some solitude together, but are interrupted by the arrival of Wade and a team of U.S. Marines, who escort them to Guantanamo base.

Cast
 Pierce Brosnan as James Bond (007), an MI6 officer assigned to stop the Janus crime syndicate from acquiring "GoldenEye", a clandestine satellite weapon designed and launched by the Soviets during the Cold War.
 Sean Bean as Alec Trevelyan (006), initially another 00 officer and Bond's friend, he fakes his death at Arkhangelsk and then establishes the Janus crime syndicate over the following nine years.
 Izabella Scorupco as Natalya Simonova, a programmer at the Severnaya lab. She survives the GoldenEye attack on its own control centre.
 Famke Janssen as Xenia Onatopp, a Georgian fighter pilot and Trevelyan's henchwoman. A sadistic lust murderer, she enjoys torturing her enemies by asphyxiating them between her thighs.
 Joe Don Baker as Jack Wade, a veteran CIA officer on the same mission as Bond. Baker previously played the villainous Brad Whitaker in The Living Daylights.
 Robbie Coltrane as Valentin Zukovsky, a Russian gangster and ex-KGB officer through whom Bond arranges a meeting with Janus.
 Tchéky Karyo as Dimitri Mishkin, the Russian Defence Minister.
 Gottfried John as General Arkady Grigorovich Ourumov, a Hero of the Soviet Union, Commander of Russia's Space Division. He is secretly an agent of Janus who abuses his authority and position to obtain control over the GoldenEye.
 Alan Cumming as Boris Grishenko, a geeky computer programmer at Severnaya, later revealed to be an affiliate of Janus.
 Michael Kitchen as Bill Tanner, M's chief of staff.
 Serena Gordon as Caroline, an MI6 psychological and psychiatric evaluator whom Bond seduces at the beginning of the film
 Desmond Llewelyn as Q, the head of Q Branch (research and development division of the British Secret Service). 
 Samantha Bond as Miss Moneypenny, M's secretary. 
 Judi Dench as M, the head of MI6 and Bond's superior.
 Minnie Driver as Irina

Production

Prelude
Following the release of Licence to Kill in July 1989, pre-production work for the seventeenth film in the James Bond series, the third to star Timothy Dalton (fulfilling his three-film contract), began in May 1990. A poster for the then-upcoming movie was even featured on the Carlton Hotel during the 1990 Cannes Film Festival. In August, The Sunday Times reported that producer Albert R. Broccoli had parted company with writer Richard Maibaum, who had worked on the scripts of all but three Bond films so far, and director John Glen, responsible for the previous five installments of the series. Broccoli listed among the possible directors John Landis, Ted Kotcheff, Roger Spottiswoode, and John Byrum. Broccoli's stepson Michael G. Wilson contributed a script, and Wiseguy co-producer Alfonse Ruggiero Jr. was hired to rewrite. Production was set to start in 1990 in Hong Kong, for a release in late 1991. It would have featured a terrorist attack on a British nuclear facility in Scotland threatening to cause World War III, Bond traveling to East Asia to investigate corrupt businessman Sir Henry Lee Ching along with jewel thief Connie Webb, and Bond fighting his former mentor Denholm Crisp. It also would have featured the Chinese Ministry of State Security. The script was further rewritten by William Osborne and William Davies. After the Gulf War, they moved the opening scene from a cyberattack on Scotland to Bond failing a mission in Libya. The film then would have focused on a high-tech stealth fighter being stolen by a Chinese People's Liberation Army general, a British industrialist, and American mobsters in order to stage a nuclear attack and coup d'état against Mainland China while leaving the industrialist in control of Hong Kong.

Dalton declared in a 2010 interview that the script was ready and "we were talking directors" before the project entered development hell caused by legal problems between Metro-Goldwyn-Mayer, parent company of the series' distributor United Artists, and Broccoli's Danjaq, owners of the Bond film rights. In 1990, MGM/UA was to be sold for $1.5 billion to Qintex, an Australian-American financial services company that had begun making television broadcast and entertainment purchases. When Qintex could not provide a $50 million letter of credit, the deal fell apart. Giancarlo Parretti, CEO of a company called Pathé Entertainment (unrelated to the French studio Pathé) quickly moved in to buy MGM/UA for $1.2 billion and merged the companies to create MGM-Pathé Communications. Parretti intended to sell off the distribution rights of the studio's catalogue so he could collect advance payments to finance the buyout. This included international broadcasting rights to the 007 library at cut-rate prices, leading Danjaq to sue, alleging the licensing violated the Bond distribution agreements the company made with United Artists in 1962, while denying Danjaq a share of the profits. Countersuits were filed. When asked what he would do following resolution of the lawsuits, Dalton told Broccoli that it was unlikely that he would continue in the role.

Parretti's behavior led to the bankruptcy of MGM-Pathé, and additional lawsuits eventually resulted in a foreclosure by financial backer Crédit Lyonnais in 1992. The Bond rights lawsuits were settled in December 1992, and the renamed Metro-Goldwyn-Mayer, now run by a Crédit Lyonnais subsidiary, began to explore further development of Bond 17 with Danjaq in 1993. Dalton was still Broccoli's choice to play Bond, but the star's original seven-year contract with Danjaq expired in 1993. Dalton has stated that the delay of his third film effectively ended the contract in 1990.

Pre-production and writing
In May 1993, MGM announced a seventeenth James Bond film was back in the works, to be based on a screenplay by Michael France. France studied for his script by traveling to Russia to interview former KGB agents. With Broccoli's health deteriorating (he died seven months after the release of GoldenEye), his daughter Barbara Broccoli described him as taking "a bit of a back seat" in the film's production. Barbara and Michael G. Wilson took the lead roles in production while Albert Broccoli oversaw the production of GoldenEye as a consulting producer, credited as "presenter". Wilson wanted to frame the film in the post-Cold War era and the aftermath of the collapse of the Soviet Union, when there were concerns of the proliferation of weapons of mass destruction. Broccoli contacted Dalton to ask again if he would come back and now found him open to the idea.

In August 1993, France had turned in his first draft, and continued to work on the script. In further discussion with Broccoli, Dalton expressed excitement over taking the best elements of his previous two films and combining them as a basis for one final film. Broccoli stressed that, after the long gap without a film, Dalton could not come back and just do a single film but needed to return for multiple films. Despite France's screenplay being completed by January, production was pushed back with no concrete start. In April 1994, Dalton officially resigned from the role. In a 2014 interview, Dalton revealed that he agreed with Broccoli's expectation but could not commit to appearing in four or five more films.

Further work was done on the screenplay throughout 1994. France's screenplay introduced the character of "Augstus Trevelyan" and the GoldenEye EMP satellite, and consisted of a cold open of an Aston Martin car chase aboard a high-speed train. However, Barbara Broccoli was concerned France's screenplay was still too unstructured and brought in Jeffrey Caine to rewrite it. Caine kept many of France's ideas but added the prologue prior to the credits and rewrote Trevelyan closer to his iteration in the final film. Kevin Wade polished the script and Bruce Feirstein added the finishing touches. In the film, the writing credit was shared by Caine and Feirstein, while France was credited with only the story, an arrangement he felt was unfair, particularly as he believed the additions made were not an improvement on his original version. Wade did not receive an official credit, but was acknowledged in the naming of Jack Wade, the CIA character he created.

While the story was not based on a work by Ian Fleming, the title GoldenEye traces its origins to the name of Fleming's Jamaican estate where he wrote the Bond novels. Fleming gave a number of origins for the name of his estate, including Carson McCullers' Reflections in a Golden Eye and Operation Goldeneye, a contingency plan Fleming himself developed during the Second World War in case of a Nazi invasion through Spain.

Although released only six years after Licence to Kill, world politics had changed dramatically in the interim. GoldenEye was the first James Bond film to be produced after the fall of the Berlin Wall, the collapse of the Soviet Union, and the end of the Cold War, and there was doubt over the character's relevance in the modern world. Some in the film industry felt it would be "futile" for the Bond series to make a comeback, and that it was best left as "an icon of the past". The producers even thought of new concepts for the series, such as a period piece set in the 1960s, a female 007, or a black James Bond. Ultimately, they chose to return to the basics of the series, not following the sensitive and caring Bond of the Dalton films or the political correctness that started to permeate the decade. The film came to be seen as a successful revitalisation, and it effectively adapted the series for the 1990s. One of GoldenEyes innovations includes the casting of a female M. In the film, the new M quickly establishes her authority, remarking that Bond is a "sexist, misogynist dinosaur" and a "relic of the Cold War". This is an early indication that Bond is portrayed as far less tempestuous than Timothy Dalton's Bond from 1989.

Casting
To replace Dalton, the producers chose Pierce Brosnan, who had been prevented from succeeding Roger Moore in 1986 because of his contract to continue starring in the television series Remington Steele. He was introduced to the public at a press conference at the Regent Palace Hotel on 8 June 1994. Before negotiating with Brosnan, Mel Gibson, Hugh Grant, and Liam Neeson passed on the role. Neeson said that he passed on the role as his then wife Natasha Richardson wouldn’t marry him if he accepted the role. Broccoli and Campbell met Ralph Fiennes about taking the part. Paul McGann was the studio's original choice for it. He would have been cast as Bond only if Brosnan had turned down the role. Brosnan was paid $1.2 million for the film, out of a total budget of $60 million. Judi Dench, an English actress, was cast as M replacing Robert Brown, making this the first film of the series featuring a female M. The decision is widely believed to have been inspired by Stella Rimington having become head of MI5 in 1992. The character of Alec Trevelyan was originally scripted as "Augustus Trevelyan" and envisaged as an older character and a mentor figure to Bond. Anthony Hopkins and Alan Rickman were reportedly sought for the role but both turned it down. Sean Bean was subsequently cast and the character was rewritten as Bond's peer. John Rhys-Davies was asked to reprise his role as General Pushkin from The Living Daylights but declined, and the character was rewritten into Defense Minister Mishkin.

John Woo was approached as the director, and turned down the opportunity, but said he was honoured by the offer. Michael Caton-Jones and Peter Medak were also considered. The producers then chose New Zealander Martin Campbell as the director. Brosnan later described Campbell as "warrior-like in his take on the piece" and that "there was a huge passion there on both our parts".

Filming
Principal photography for the film began on 16 January 1995 and continued until 2 June. The producers were unable to film at Pinewood Studios, the usual studio for Bond films, because it had been reserved for First Knight. Instead, an old Rolls-Royce factory at Leavesden Aerodrome in Hertfordshire was converted into a new studio, dubbed Leavesden Studios. This process is shown on the 2006 DVD's special features.

The bungee jump was filmed at the Contra Dam (also known as the Verzasca or Locarno Dam) in Ticino, Switzerland. The casino scenes and the Tiger helicopter's demonstration were shot in Monte Carlo. Reference footage for the tank chase was shot on location in Saint Petersburg and matched to the studio at Leavesden. The climactic scenes on the satellite dish were shot at Arecibo Observatory in Puerto Rico. The actual MI6 headquarters were used for external views of M's office. Some of the scenes in St. Petersburg were actually shot in London – the Epsom Downs Racecourse doubled as the airport – to reduce expenses and security concerns, as the second unit sent to Russia required bodyguards.

The French Navy provided full use of the frigate La Fayette and their newest helicopter, the Eurocopter Tiger, to the film's production team. The French government also allowed the use of Navy logos as part of the promotional campaign for it. However, the producers had a dispute with the French Ministry of Defence over Brosnan's opposition to French nuclear weapons testing and his involvement with Greenpeace; as a result, the French premiere of the film was cancelled.

The sequences involving the armored train were filmed on the Nene Valley Railway, near Peterborough in England. The train was composed of a British Rail Class 20 diesel-electric locomotive and a pair of Mark 1 coaches, all three heavily disguised to resemble a Soviet armoured train.

Effects

The film was the last one of special effects supervisor Derek Meddings, to whom it was dedicated. Meddings' major contribution was miniatures. It was also the first Bond film to use computer-generated imagery. Among the model effects are most external shots of Severnaya, the scene where Janus' train crashes into the tank, and the lake which hides the satellite dish, since the producers could not find a round lake in Puerto Rico. The climax in the satellite dish used scenes in Arecibo, a model built by Meddings' team and scenes shot with stuntmen in Britain.

Stunt car coordinator Rémy Julienne described the car chase between the Aston Martin DB5 and the Ferrari F355 as between "a perfectly shaped, old and vulnerable vehicle and a racecar." The stunt had to be meticulously planned as the cars are vastly different. Nails had to be attached to the F355 tyres to make it skid, and during one take of the sliding vehicles, the two cars collided.

The largest stunt sequence in the film was the tank chase, which took around six weeks to film, partly on location in St. Petersburg and partly on the old de Havilland runway at Leavesden. According to second-unit director Ian Sharp it was thought up by special effects supervisor Chris Corbould, during a pre-production meeting that lasted only ten minutes. Parts of the tank chase were filmed at the backlot of Leavesden, parts on location in St. Petersburg. The whole chase was storyboarded very carefully, said Sharp. A Russian T-54/T-55 tank, on loan from the East England Military Museum, was modified with the addition of fake explosive reactive armour panels. To avoid destroying the pavement on the city streets of St. Petersburg, the steel off-road tracks of the T-54/55 were replaced with the rubber-shoed tracks from a British Chieftain tank. The T-55 tank used in the film is now on permanent display at Old Buckenham Airfield, where the East England Military Museum is based.

For the confrontation between Bond and Trevelyan inside the antenna cradle, director Campbell decided to take inspiration from Bond's fight with Red Grant in From Russia with Love. Brosnan and Bean did all the stunts themselves, except for one take where one is thrown against the wall. Brosnan injured his hand while filming the extending ladder sequence, making producers delay his scenes and film the ones in Severnaya earlier.

The opening  bungee jump at Arkhangelsk, shot at the Contra Dam in Switzerland and performed by Wayne Michaels, was voted the best movie stunt of all time in a 2002 Sky Movies poll, and set a record for the highest bungee jump off a fixed structure. The ending of the pre-credits sequence with Bond jumping after the aeroplane features Jacques Malnuit riding the motorcycle to the edge and jumping, and B.J. Worth diving after the plane – which was a working aircraft, with Worth adding that part of the difficulty of the stunt was the kerosene striking his face.

The fall of Communism in Russia is the main focus of the opening titles, designed by Daniel Kleinman (who took over from Maurice Binder after his death in 1991). They show the collapse and destruction of several structures associated with the Soviet Union, such as the red star, statues of Communist leaders—notably Joseph Stalin—and the hammer and sickle. In an interview, Kleinman said they were meant to be "a kind of story telling sequence" showing that "what was happening in Communist countries was Communism was falling down". According to producer Michael G. Wilson, some Communist parties protested against "Socialist symbols being destroyed not by governments, but by bikini-clad women", especially certain Indian Communist parties, which threatened to boycott the film.

Product placement

The film was the first one bound by BMW's three-picture deal, so the producers were offered BMW's latest roadster, the BMW Z3. It was featured in the film months before its release, and a limited edition "007 model" sold out within a day of being available to order. As part of the car's marketing strategy, several Z3's were used to drive journalists from a complimentary meal at the Rainbow Room restaurant to its premiere at the Radio City Music Hall.

For the film, a convertible Z3 is equipped with the usual Q refinements, including a self-destruct feature and Stinger missiles behind the headlights. The Z3 does not have much screen time and none of the gadgets are used, which Martin Campbell attributed to the deal with BMW coming in the last stages of production. The Z3's appearance in the film is thought to be the most successful promotion through product placement in 1995. Ten years later, The Hollywood Reporter listed it as one of the most successful product placements in recent years. The article quoted Mary Lou Galician, head of media analysis and criticism at Arizona State University's Walter Cronkite School of Journalism and Mass Communication, as saying that the news coverage of Bond's switch from Aston Martin to BMW "generated hundreds of millions of dollars of media exposure for the movie and all of its marketing partners."

In addition, all computers in the film were provided by IBM, and in some scenes (such as the pen grenade scene towards the end), the OS/2 Warp splash screen can be seen on computer monitors. During the Q Lab scene, James Bond can be seen using an IBM ThinkPad laptop ignoring Q's instructions on the use of a leather belt modified with a piton gun. This moment was not present in early drafts of the film, but it is understood that director Martin Campbell had 007 fiddling with the keyboard of this computer as a way to show Bond was visibly ignoring the Quartermaster, but also as a way increase IBM's product placement arrangement.

A modified Omega Seamaster Professional Diver 300M wristwatch features as a spy gadget device several times in the film, concealing a cutting laser and detonator remote. This was the first time Bond was shown to be wearing a watch by Omega, and he has since worn Omega watches in every subsequent production.

While the scene of the tank running through a truck full of drinks was storyboarded with a Pepsi truck, Perrier signed in a deal to be featured, providing around 90,000 cans for the scene.

Marketing
As James Bond entered in the 1990s, hand-painted poster designs were eschewed in favor of cutting-edge photomontage tools, promoting the return of 007 portrayed by Pierce Brosnan. Under the direction of John Parkinson and Gordon Arnell from the marketing department of MGM, many posters were produced for the film designed by Randi Braun and Earl Klasky with photographs taken by John Stoddart, Terry O'Neill, Keith Hamshere and George Withear. In the United States, an advance poster featured a gold-hued close-up on Bond's eyes pointing his Walther PPK handgun towards the viewer. The logo of the film was not displayed, only a tagline: "There is no substitute" and the 007 gun logo, in red. For the international market, a different advance poster was issued on which Pierce Brosnan appeared in black dinner jacket holding his silenced PPK gun, next to a 007 logo and under a different tagline: "You know the name. You know the number". This time, the film's logo was introduced, using the MatrixWide typeface (earlier versions of this logo used a modified FrizQuadrata typography). The theatrical artwork had two variations: both retained the same black background and action scenes collage surrounding the three principals (Pierce Brosnan, Izabella Scorupco and Famke Janssen), but the International poster had James Bond in tuxedo while in the US version only had the secret agent's face emerging from the shadows. The US variant was used for the cover artwork of the film's soundtrack and the box of the Nintendo 64 video game adaptation released in 1997. On a 2015 interview regarding his take on the GoldenEye poster campaign, photographer John Stoddart (who previously worked with Brosnan for a Brioni photoshoot) said his only directive was "Bond, girls and guns"

In July 1995, a teaser trailer for GoldenEye was attached to prints of Roger Donaldson's film Species after its debut on the syndicated US television program Extra, followed by a more generic theatrical trailer which revealed Bond's confrontation with agent 006. Asked about the inclusion of this spoiler in a 2019 interview, former MGM/UA Vice-president Jeff Kleeman pointed out that he felt "the idea of 006 vs 007 was a selling point". Both trailers were directed by Joe Nimziki.

Music

The theme song, "GoldenEye", was written by Bono and the Edge, and was performed by Tina Turner. As the producers did not collaborate with Bono or the Edge, the film score did not incorporate any of the theme song's melodies, as was the case in previous James Bond films. Swedish group Ace of Base had also written a proposed theme song, but label Arista Records pulled the band out of the project fearing the negative impact in case the film flopped. The song was then rewritten as their single "The Juvenile".

The soundtrack was composed and performed by Éric Serra. Prolific Bond composer John Barry said that despite an offer by Barbara Broccoli, he turned it down. Serra's score has been criticised: Richard von Busack, in Metro, wrote that it was "more appropriate for a ride on an elevator than a ride on a roller coaster", and Filmtracks said Serra "failed completely in his attempt to tie GoldenEye to the franchise's past."

Martin Campbell would later express his disappointment with the score, citing budget constraints and difficulty working with Serra, who became uncooperative when asked to re-score the St. Petersburg tank chase after Campbell rejected his submitted track. John Altman would later provide the music for the sequence, while Serra's original track can still be found on the soundtrack as "A Pleasant Drive in St. Petersburg".

Serra composed and performed a number of synthesiser tracks, including the version of the "James Bond Theme" that plays during the gun barrel sequence, while Altman and David Arch provided the more traditional symphonic music. The end credits song, Serra's "The Experience of Love", was based on a short cue Serra had originally written for Luc Besson's Léon one year earlier.

Release and reception
GoldenEye premiered on 13 November 1995, at the Radio City Music Hall, and went on general release in the United States on 17 November 1995. The UK premiere followed on 21 November at the Odeon Leicester Square, with general release three days later. The film also had the German premiere on 5 December, at which Brosnan was present, at Mathäser-Filmpalast (de) in Munich, with general release on December 28; and the Swedish premiere on 8 December, attended by Brosnan and Scorupco, at Rigoletto (sv) in Stockholm, with general release on the same day. The after-party took place at Stockholm's Grand Hôtel. Brosnan boycotted the French premiere to support Greenpeace's protest against the French nuclear testing program.

The film earned over $26 million during its opening across 2,667 cinemas in the United States and Canada. In the United Kingdom, it grossed a record $5.5 million for a non-holiday week from 448 theatres and was the third biggest in history behind Jurassic Park and Batman Forever. It had the fourth-highest worldwide gross of all films in 1995, and was the most successful Bond film since Moonraker, taking inflation into account.

GoldenEye posted the largest revenue increase over its predecessor of any Bond film; when adjusted for inflation, it grossed 83% more worldwide than the preceding Bond film, 1989's Licence to Kill.

The film was edited to be guaranteed a PG-13 rating from the MPAA and a 12 rating from the BBFC. The cuts included the visible bullet impact to Trevelyan's head when he is shot in the prologue, several additional deaths during the sequence in which Onatopp guns down the workers at the Severnaya station, more explicit footage and violent behaviour in the Admiral's death, extra footage of Onatopp's death, and Bond knocking her out with a rabbit punch in the car. In 2006, the film was remastered and re-edited for the James Bond Ultimate Edition DVD in which the BBFC cuts were restored, causing the rating to be changed to 15. However, the original MPAA edits still remain.

Reviews
The critical reception of the film was mostly positive. Film review aggregator website Rotten Tomatoes holds it at a 80% approval rating. Its consensus states: "The first and best Pierce Brosnan Bond film, GoldenEye brings the series into a more modern context, and the result is a 007 entry that's high-tech, action-packed, and urbane." A similar site, Metacritic, holds it at 65. Audiences polled by CinemaScore gave the film an average grade of "A−" on an A+ to F scale.

In the Chicago Sun-Times, Roger Ebert gave the film 3 stars out of 4, and said Brosnan's Bond was "somehow more sensitive, more vulnerable, more psychologically complete" than the previous ones, also commenting on Bond's "loss of innocence" since previous films. James Berardinelli described Brosnan as "a decided improvement over his immediate predecessor" with a "flair for wit to go along with his natural charm", but added that "fully one-quarter of GoldenEye is momentum-killing padding."

Several reviewers lauded M's appraisal of Bond as a "sexist, misogynist dinosaur", with Todd McCarthy in Variety saying the film "breathes fresh creative and commercial life" into the series. John Puccio of DVD Town said that it was "an eye- and ear-pleasing, action-packed entry in the Bond series" and that the film gave Bond "a bit of humanity, too". Ian Nathan of Empire said that it "revamps that indomitable British spirit" and that the Die Hard movies "don't even come close to 007". Tom Sonne of The Sunday Times considered it the best Bond film since The Spy Who Loved Me. Jose Arroyo of Sight & Sound considered the greatest success of it was in modernising the series.

However, the film received several negative reviews. Richard Schickel of Time wrote that after "a third of a century's hard use", Bond's conventions survived on "wobbly knees", while in Entertainment Weekly, Owen Gleiberman thought the series had "entered a near-terminal state of exhaustion." Kenneth Turan of the Los Angeles Times said that it was "a middle-aged entity anxious to appear trendy at all costs". David Eimer of Premiere wrote that "the trademark humour is in short supply" and that "Goldeneye isn't classic Bond by any stretch of the imagination."

Retrospective reviews
Often cited as Pierce Brosnan's best Bond film, GoldenEyes reputation has only improved since its release. It is ranked high in Bond-related lists, as IGN chose it as the fifth-best movie, while Entertainment Weekly ranked it eighth, and Norman Wilner of MSN as ninth. EW also voted Xenia Onatopp as the sixth-most memorable Bond girl, while IGN ranked Natalya as seventh in a similar list. The film enjoys a large and enthusiastic following among Bond fans, especially those who grew up with the GoldenEye 007 video game.

In a 2021 Yahoo survey consisting of 2200 scholars and Bond superfans, GoldenEye was voted as the best Bond film, followed by Daniel Craig's Casino Royale and George Lazenby's On Her Majesty's Secret Service.

Awards
The film was nominated for two BAFTAs—Best Sound and Special Visual Effects—in 1996, but lost to Braveheart and Apollo 13, respectively. Éric Serra won a BMI Film Award for the soundtrack, and it also earned nominations for Best Action, Adventure or Thriller Film and Actor at the 22nd Saturn Awards, and Best Fight at the 1996 MTV Movie Awards.

Appearances in other media

The film was the second and final Bond film to be adapted to a novel by novelist John Gardner. The book closely follows its storyline, but Gardner added a violent sequence prior to the opening bungee jump in which Bond kills a group of Russian guards, a change that would be retained and expanded upon in the video game GoldenEye 007.

In late 1995, Topps Comics began publishing a three-issue comic book adaptation of the film. The script was adapted by Don McGregor with art by Rick Magyar. The first issue carried a January 1996 cover date. For unknown reasons, Topps cancelled the entire adaptation after the first issue had been published, and to date the adaptation has not been released in its entirety.

Also in 1995, Tiger Electronics released a third-person shooter handheld electronic game in two different variants: a gamepad variant, with a liquid-crystal display (LCD), a cross-shaped push button and two line-shaped ones and four settings buttons on the lower side of the screen, and a "Grip Games" line variant, shaped like a pistol grip, with a trigger used to shoot and other buttons on the rear. The two editions were slightly different.

The film was the basis for GoldenEye 007, a video game for the Nintendo 64 developed by Rare and published by Nintendo. It was praised by critics and in January 2000, readers of the British video game magazine Computer and Video Games listed it in first place in a list of "the hundred greatest video games". In Edges 10th anniversary issue in 2003, the game was included as one of their top ten shooters of all time. It is based upon the film, but many of the missions were extended or modified.

The game was modified into a racing game intended to be released for the Virtual Boy console. However, it was cancelled before release. In 2004, Electronic Arts released GoldenEye: Rogue Agent, the first game of the James Bond series in which the player does not take on the role of Bond. Instead, the protagonist is an aspiring Double-0 agent Jonathan Hunter, known by his codename "GoldenEye", recruited by a villain of the Bond universe, Auric Goldfinger. Except for the appearance of Xenia Onatopp, it was unrelated to the film, and was released to mediocre reviews. It was excoriated by several critics including Eric Qualls for using the name "GoldenEye" as an attempt to ride on the success of Rare's game. In 2010, an independent development team released GoldenEye: Source, a multiplayer only total conversion mod developed using Valve's Source engine.

Nintendo announced a remake of the original GoldenEye 007 at their E3 press conference on 15 June 2010. It is a modernised retelling of the original movie's story, with Daniel Craig playing the role of Bond. Bruce Feirstein returned to write a modernised version of the script, while Nicole Scherzinger covered the theme song. It was developed by Eurocom and published by Activision for the Wii and Nintendo DS and was released in November 2010. Both the DS and Wii versions bear little to no resemblance to the locations and weapons of the original N64 release. In 2011, the game was ported to PlayStation 3 and Xbox 360 under the name GoldenEye 007: Reloaded.

Legacy
The malware Petya (also known as "GoldenEye") is a reference to the film. A Twitter account, suspected by the German newspaper Heise Online to belong to the malware author, used an image of Boris Grishenko as their avatar.

See also

 9K720 Iskander
 Counter-electronics High Power Microwave Advanced Missile Project (CHAMP)
 Outline of James Bond

References

Explanatory notes

Citations

External links

 
 
 
 
 MGM's official GoldenEye website

 
1990s action adventure films
1990s adventure thriller films
1990s spy thriller films
1995 action thriller films
1995 films
American action adventure films
American action thriller films
American adventure thriller films
American films about revenge
American sequel films
American spy thriller films
British films about revenge
British sequel films
Eon Productions films
Films about computing
Films about nuclear war and weapons
Films about space programs
Films about terrorism in Europe
Films adapted into comics
Films directed by Martin Campbell
Films produced by Barbara Broccoli
Films produced by Michael G. Wilson
Films scored by Éric Serra
Films set in 1986
Films set in 1995
Films set in Cuba
Films set in Monaco
Films set in Saint Petersburg
Films set in Siberia
Films set in the Soviet Union
Films shot at Warner Bros. Studios, Leavesden
Films shot in Cambridgeshire
Films shot in France
Films shot in Hertfordshire
Films shot in London
Films shot in Monaco
Films shot in Puerto Rico
Films shot in Saint Petersburg
Films shot in Surrey
Films shot in Wiltshire
Films with screenplays by Bruce Feirstein
Films with screenplays by Jeffrey Caine
Films with screenplays by Michael France
Films shot in Switzerland
James Bond films
Metro-Goldwyn-Mayer films
United Artists films
1990s American films
1990s British films